Mansfield Hollow State Park is a public recreation area occupying  of leased lands on the western shore of  Mansfield Hollow Lake in the town of Mansfield, Connecticut. The state park is one portion of the  leased by the Connecticut Department of Energy and Environmental Protection from the U.S. Army Corps of Engineers for recreational and wildlife management purposes. Geologic features of the park include remnants of the last glacial period, where retreating glaciers left kames, eskers, and kettles. Recreational opportunities include facilities for boating, fishing, picnicking, hiking, mountain biking, and cross-country skiing. The park is traversed by the southeastern leg of the Nipmuck Trail.

References

External links
Mansfield Hollow State Park Connecticut Department of Energy and Environmental Protection
Mansfield Hollow State Park Map Connecticut Department of Energy and Environmental Protection

State parks of Connecticut
Parks in Windham County, Connecticut
Parks in Tolland County, Connecticut
Windham, Connecticut
Mansfield, Connecticut
Willimantic, Connecticut
Protected areas established in 1952
Kames
1952 establishments in Connecticut